Nampong is one of the 60 assembly constituencies of  Arunachal Pradesh a north east state of India. It is part of Arunachal East Lok Sabha constituency.

Members of Legislative Assembly
 1990: Komoli Mosang, Indian National Congress
 1995: Setong Sena, Independent
 1999: Setong Sena, Indian National Congress
 2004: Setong Sena, Indian National Congress
 2009: Setong Sena, Indian National Congress
 2014: Laisam Simai, Bharatiya Janata Party

Election results

2019

See also

 Nampong
 Changlang district
 List of constituencies of Arunachal Pradesh Legislative Assembly

References

Assembly constituencies of Arunachal Pradesh
Changlang district